Himerarctia docis is a moth of the family Erebidae. It was described by Jacob Hübner in 1831. It is found in French Guiana, Guyana, Brazil, Colombia, Peru and Bolivia.

References

 

Phaegopterina
Moths described in 1831